Winfred Jarrett Dukes (born September 20, 1958) is an American politician from Georgia. Dukes is a former Democratic member of the Georgia House of Representatives.

Biography
Dukes was born and raised in Mitchell County, Georgia, the son of Mrs. Willie Beatrice Dukes and Sylvester Dukes. A product of the public school system, he is a 1974 graduate of Mitchell County High School where he received the General Excellency Award.

He earned a bachelor arts degree in history with a minor in accounting from Mercer University in Macon, Georgia. He also earned a master's degree in Management from Georgia College and State University in Milledgeville, Georgia.

Winfred Dukes serves as chief executive officer of Dukes, Edwards and Dukes, Inc., a family owned construction/real estate firm based in Albany, Georgia. He has received numerous awards and honors for outstanding contributions in business and community service including the Georgia Summit of African-American Business Organizations' Wolf Award and Certificate of Appreciation from the Albany State University Entrepreneurship Project. He received the Omega Psi Phi Citizen of the year Award in 1993, 1997, and 1999. He also received the Georgia State Omega Psi Phi Fraternity Citizen Award for 2000 and the Georgia Rural Health Association Legislator of the Year Award in 2000. Representative Dukes was recognized by the Georgia Municipal Association as a Champion for Georgia's Cities in 2004.

As State Representative of House District 150, which includes Baker and Dougherty Counties, his committee assignments are Economic Development and Tourism, Industrial Relations, and State Planning and Community Affairs. During his first term (1996–1997) he served as whip for the Georgia legislative Black Caucus. Winfred Dukes was elected to serve as second vice chairman of Georgia Democratic Party during the 1998 state Democratic Convention.

Dukes is a member of Omega Psi Phi Fraternity, the South Georgia Minority Contractors’ Association, Albany Area Chamber of Commerce, Home Builders Association of Albany, and Southwest Georgia, Albany-Dougherty Chapter of the NAACP, and a Silver Life Member of the NAACP.

He is an active member of the Mt. Zion Missionary Baptist Church in Mitchell County, where he serves as financial secretary and a member of the Trustee Board.

On March 1, 2022, Dukes announced his candidacy for Agriculture Commissioner of Georgia.

See also 
Democratic Party of Georgia

References

External links
Winfred Dukes
Project Vote Smart: Representative Winfred J. Dukes's Biography
Georgia State House of Representatives
Georgia General Assembly
House Higher Education Committee Chairman
House Industry Committee Member
House Retirement Committee Member
Famous Mercer University Alumni
GA State Legislation

|-

|-

|-

1958 births
Democratic Party members of the Georgia House of Representatives
Living people
African-American businesspeople
American businesspeople
African-American state legislators in Georgia (U.S. state)
People from Mitchell County, Georgia
Mercer University alumni
21st-century American politicians
21st-century African-American politicians
20th-century African-American people